Marcel Biyouha Ndjeng (born 6 May 1982) is a former professional footballer who played as a midfielder. Born in West Germany, he played for the Cameroon national team at International level. He is the brother of Dominique Ndjeng, who also played football professionally.

Club career
In 2009, Ndjeng joined Hamburger SV on loan from Borussia Mönchengladbach. On 28 June 2009, he signed a two-year contract with FC Augsburg.

International career
Marcel Ndjeng was born in Germany to a Cameroonian father and German mother. He was called up, and debuted for the Cameroon national team 15 May 2008.

Personal
His brother Dominique Ndjeng was also a professional footballer.

References

External links
 
 
 

1982 births
Living people
Sportspeople from Bonn
German people of Cameroonian descent
Cameroonian people of German descent
Citizens of Cameroon through descent
German sportspeople of African descent
German footballers
Cameroonian footballers
Footballers from North Rhine-Westphalia
Association football midfielders
Cameroon international footballers
Borussia Mönchengladbach players
Bundesliga players
2. Bundesliga players
Hamburger SV players
Hamburger SV II players
SC Paderborn 07 players
Fortuna Düsseldorf players
Arminia Bielefeld players
FC Augsburg players
Segunda División B players
CD Atlético Baleares footballers
Cameroonian expatriate footballers
German expatriate footballers
Cameroonian expatriate sportspeople in Spain
German expatriate sportspeople in Spain
Expatriate footballers in Spain